The Jingak Order, is a South Korean Esoteric Buddhist sect founded in 1947 by Grand Master Hoedang (Kyu-Shang Sohn, 1902–1963). The order places more emphasis on Vairocana rather than Sakyamuni Buddha, and the sect's guiding doctrine is Dharmkaya-Mahavairocana Buddha, which is described as "The oneness who is immanent in the world, which includes three stages of existence." Its esoteric doctrines are based on a revised form of the teachings of Shingon Buddhism and include the dual mandalas of Garbhadhatu and Vajradhatu. Their chief mantra is the Korean version of the Six-Syllables Mantra: "Om Ma Ni Ban Me Hum."

The Jingak Order falls within the realm of Engaged Buddhism or Humanistic Buddhism in that it seeks to apply Buddhist principles and teachings towards improvement of the saha world. To that end, the order runs its own Social Welfare Foundation. In addition to "parishes" in South Korea, the order also has parishes in China, Nepal, Sri Lanka, Canada, and the United States.

The order observes different rituals from other Buddhists. Monks may marry and grow their hair, and married couples may preach together.

References

External links
  Official site

Buddhism in Korea